Mirjana Bohanec-Vidović (born October 2, 1939) is a Croatian operatic soprano. She studied singing at the Academy of Music, University of Zagreb and with Emmy Loose in Vienna. She made her professional opera debut in 1966 at the Croatian National Theatre in Zagreb, remaining there as a resident artist for two years. From 1968-1969 she was committed to the Vienna Volksoper. She returned to the Croatian National Opera in 1970 where she remained for the rest of her career. Her repertoire mainly consisted of soubrette and lyric coloratura soprano roles, including Adina in Gaetano Donizetti's L'elisir d'amore, Nedda in Ruggero Leoncavallo's Pagliacci, Norina in Donizetti's Don Pasquale, Oscar in Giuseppe Verdi's Un ballo in maschera, Susanna in Wolfgang Amadeus Mozart's The Marriage of Figaro, Violetta in Verdi's La Traviata, and Zerlina in Mozart's Don Giovanni. She is married to Dr. Ivo Vidović, director of home health in Runjanin street in Zagreb.

Movies 

 "Putovanje u Vučjak", as a Šolcova (1986)
 "Živi bili pa vidjeli", as a Mrs. Klarić (1979)
 "Skakavac", (1975)
 "Živjeti od ljubavi", as a Vanda (1973)
 "Tko pjeva zlo ne misli", as an Ana Šafranek (1970)
 "Tri sata za ljubav", (1968)

References

1939 births
Living people
Croatian operatic sopranos
Yugoslav women opera singers
Academy of Music, University of Zagreb alumni
Musicians from Zagreb